KOI8-F or KOI8 Unified is an 8-bit character set. It was designed by Peter Cassetta of Fingertip Software (now defunct) as an attempt to support all the encoded letters from both KOI8-E (ISO-IR-111) and KOI8-RU (and hence also, KOI8-U and KOI8-R), along with some of the pseudographics from KOI8-R, with some additional punctuation in the remaining space, sourced partly from Windows-1251. This encoding was only used in the software of that company.

Character set
The following table shows the KOI8-F encoding. Each character is shown with its equivalent Unicode code point. Differences from ISO-IR-111 are boxed; other relevant encodings which are matched, if any, are noted in footnotes.

See also
KOI character encodings

References 

Character sets